This is a demography of Guyana including population density, ethnicity, education level, health of the populace, economic status, religious affiliations and other aspects of the population.

Guyana's population (Guyanese people) is made up of five main ethnic groups: Indians, Africans, Amerindians, Europeans (mainly Portuguese), and Chinese.

Guyana continues to be influenced by British culture, as well as the cultures of the United States, Europe, Africa, the Islamic world, East and South Asian countries, and Latin America, especially the neighboring countries of Venezuela and Brazil. It is one of three countries and two territories to form the Guianas, such as Suriname and territories like the French Guiana and parts of neighboring countries named for Guayana (Venezuela) and Amapá of Brazil.

Population
The proportion of children below the age of 15 in 2010 was 33.6%, 62.1% was between 15 and 65 years of age, while 4.3% was 65 years or older.

Structure of the population 

Structure of the population (01.07.2010) (Estimates – unrevised data)

Age structure
0–14 years:
35.6% (male 135,629; female 131,518; total 267,146)
15–64 years:
60.2% (male 226,058; female 226,551; total 452,609)
65 years and over:
4.2% (male 14,347; female 17,120; total 31,467) (2002 census)

Vital statistics
The Population Departement of the United Nations prepared the following estimates of vital statistics of Guyana.

Vital statistics

Fertility and births
Total Fertility Rate (TFR) (Wanted Fertility Rate) and Crude Birth Rate (CBR):

Ethnic groups

The present population of Guyana is racially and ethnically heterogeneous, with ethnic groups originating from India, Africa, Europe, and China, as well as indigenous or aboriginal peoples.

The largest ethnic group are the Indo-Guyanese, the descendants of indentured laborers from India, who make up 39.8% of the population, according to the 2012 census. They are followed by the Afro-Guyanese, the descendants of enslaved laborers from Africa, who constitute 29.3. Guyanese of mixed heritage make up 19.9% while the indigenous peoples (known locally as Amerindians) make up 10.5% The indigenous groups include the Arawaks, the Wai Wai, the Caribs, the Akawaio, the Arecuna, the Patamona, the Wapixana, the Macushi, and the Warao. The two largest groups, the Indo-Guyanese and Afro-Guyanese, have experienced some racial tension.

Most Indo-Guyanese are descended from indentured laborers who migrated from North India, especially the Bhojpur and Awadh regions of the Hindi Belt in the present day states of Uttar Pradesh, Bihar and Jharkhand. A significant minority of Indo-Guyanese are also descended from indentured migrants who came from the South Indian states of Tamil Nadu and Andhra Pradesh. However, among the immigrants there were also labourers from other parts of South Asia such as Nepal, Bengal, Chota Nagpur, and Northwestern India.

The distribution pattern in the 2002 census was similar to those of the 1980 and 1991 censuses, but the share of the two main groups has declined. Indo-Guyanese made up 51.9% of the total population in 1980, but by 1991 this had fallen to 48.6%, and then to 43.5% in the 2002 census. Those of African descent increased slightly from 30.8% to 32.3% during the first period (1980 and 1991) before falling to 30.2% in the 2002 census. With small growth in the overall population, the decline in the shares of the two larger groups has resulted in the relative increase of shares of the multiracial and Amerindian groups. The Amerindian population rose by 22,097 people between 1991 and 2002. This represents an increase of 47.3% or annual growth of 3.5%. Similarly, the multiracial population increased by 37,788 persons, representing a 43.0% increase or annual growth rate of 3.2% from the base period of 1991 census.

The number of Chinese and White population (mostly consisting of Portuguese) is about 0.5%.

Language

English is the official language of Guyana, which is the only South American country with English as the official language.

Guyanese Creole (an English-based creole with African and Indian syntax) is widely spoken in Guyana.

A number of Amerindian languages are also spoken by a minority of the population. These include Cariban languages such as Macushi, Akawaio and Wai-Wai, and Arawakan languages such as Arawak (or Lokono) and Wapishana.

Other languages include Chinese spoken by some members of the Chinese community, Portuguese spoken by some Portuguese Guyanese, Dutch spoken by Surinamese in Guyana, and Guyanese Hindustani and Tamil spoken by a few older members of the Indian Guyanese community, as well as Sarnami Hindustani spoken by Indians from Suriname.

Second and third languages 
Portuguese is increasingly widely used as a second language in Guyana, particularly in the south of the country near the Brazil border. Dutch and French are spoken by those who frequently visit neighboring Suriname and French Guiana respectively. French is widely taught in secondary schools along with Spanish as foreign languages. Spanish is also used by a minority of the population as a second language. Spanish is spoken typically by visitors and residents from Venezuela.

Religion

Notes

References

External links
CIA World Factbook – Guyana